Harwich Center station was a train station located in Harwich, Massachusetts. The station was built in 1887 by the Chatham Railroad Company when the line was extended beyond Harwich.

References

Harwich, Massachusetts
Old Colony Railroad Stations on Cape Cod
Stations along Old Colony Railroad lines
Former railway stations in Massachusetts
1887 establishments in Massachusetts
Railway stations in the United States opened in 1887